This is a glossary of acronyms, initialisms and terms used for gliding and soaring. This is a specialized subset of broader aviation, aerospace, and aeronautical terminology. Additional definitions can be found in the FAA Glider Flying Handbook.



References 

Glossaries of aviation
Gliding
Wikipedia glossaries using description lists